Jonstorp is a locality situated in Höganäs Municipality in northwestern Skåne County, Sweden. It had 1,880 inhabitants in 2010.

Jonstorp located at Skälder Bay beach. Tunneberga Inn serves traditional fare and is a popular destination for families as well as bus tours. On June 6 each year organizes Byalaget 'Jonstorp Day', a feast for both villagers and visitors. During the summer, attracts also visited Kulla market with fairground and traders. The market is held by tradition always the first weekend in July with Jonstorp IF as an arranger. The football team also organizes annually a large flea market on the first Sunday in September. In addition, the village has its own sports club with both contestants and senior squad gymnasts gymnastics and an ice hockey club which traditionally had great success at the junior side!

The actor Edvard Persson lived in Rekekroken outside Jonstorp from 1950 until his death and is buried in the cemetery Jonstorp.

Swedish Tourist Board operates a popular hostel, STF Hostel Jonstorp, Bläsinge 1:11 in the property which was formerly a home for deaf and blind.

In Skåne Business Archives in Helsingborg store archive documents from a number of older producers' cooperative societies in Jonstorp, including street lighting club, potato growers association and Jonstorp and Farhult electric cooperative.
Tipifesten [edit]

Each year in July arranged the great music and cultural festival, Tipifesten in the district. Behind the event is Luna Music Association, which is an ideal organization headquartered in Jonstorp. The party that is family friendly, camping paddock kept in a sheep pasture between Svanshall and Södåkra. The future is uncertain when the club has announced that 2008 is the last Tipifesten.

References 

Tipifestens officiella webbplats
Jonstorps-Farhulstbladet Nr 14, med artikel om Tipifesten
Jonstorps Gymnastikförening
Jonstorps Fotbollsförening
Jonstorps Ishockeyförening/sämsta-föreningen-i-sverige

Populated places in Höganäs Municipality
Populated places in Skåne County
Coastal cities and towns in Sweden